Frederik "Frits" Carel Kuipers (11 July 1899 in Lent, Gelderland – 10 October 1943 in Heemstede) was a football (soccer) player from the Netherlands, who was included in the Netherlands national football team for the 1920 Summer Olympics, winning the bronze medal. In his final international match in 1923 he captained the Netherlands team. Kuipers played for Quick Nijmegen and Koninklijke HFC. He competed in rowing on national level and his profession was physician.

References

External links
  Dutch Olympic Committee

1899 births
1943 deaths
People from Overbetuwe
Dutch footballers
Footballers at the 1920 Summer Olympics
Olympic footballers of the Netherlands
Olympic bronze medalists for the Netherlands
Netherlands international footballers
Olympic medalists in football
Medalists at the 1920 Summer Olympics
Association football midfielders
Koninklijke HFC players
Road incident deaths in the Netherlands
Motorcycle road incident deaths
Sportspeople from Gelderland